Malakhovo is a rural locality (a selo) in Aleysky Selsoviet, Aleysky District, Altai Krai, Russia. The population was 215 as of 2013. There are 7 streets.

Geography 
Malakhovo is located on the Aley River, 13 km south of Aleysk (the district's administrative centre) by road. Zelyonaya Polyana is the nearest rural locality.

References 

Rural localities in Aleysky District